M. Firon & Co. is one of the largest law firms in Israel.

History
M. Firon was founded in 1950 by Adv. Zvi Firon. Its offices are in Ramat Gan, with branch offices in Jerusalem, Beer Sheva and Haifa. The firm specializes in commercial law, corporate law, real estate, litigation, construction, public works, antitrust laws, capital markets and matters dealing with the defense industry.

References

External links
 M. Firon Profile on Chambers & Partners
 M. Firon Profile on Legal 500
 M. Firon & Co. Profile on Dun's 100
 M. Firon Profile on Interlaw

Law firms established in 1950
Law firms of Israel